The 1917 Centre football team represented Centre College in the 1917 college football season and began a string of unparalleled success for the school. The first two games were coached by Robert L. Myers, and the rest by Charley Moran. According to Centre publications, "Myers realized he was dealing with a group of exceptional athletes, who were far beyond his ability to coach. He needed someone who could the team justice, and found that person in Charles Moran."

In 1916, Myers became coach at his alma mater Centre after coaching at North Side High School in Fort Worth, Texas. His team there included future Centre stars Bo McMillin and Red Weaver, who were recruited by boosters to Somerset High School in Kentucky where they joined up with Red Roberts. Also at North Side were Sully Montgomery, Matty Bell, Bill James, and Bob Mathias. McMillin kicked and made his only ever field goal attempt to defeat Kentucky 3 to 0.

Edgar Diddle was a halfback on the team.

Schedule

References

Centre
Centre Colonels football seasons
Centre football